Delafossite is a copper iron oxide mineral with formula CuFeO2 or Cu1+Fe3+O2. It is a member of the delafossite mineral group, which has the general formula ABO2, a group characterized by sheets of linearly coordinated A cations stacked between edge-shared octahedral layers (BO6). Delafossite, along with other minerals of the ABO2 group, is known for its wide range of electrical properties, its conductivity varying from insulating to metallic. Delafossite is usually a secondary mineral that crystallizes in association with oxidized copper and rarely occurs as a primary mineral.

Composition
The chemical formula for delafossite is CuFeO2, which was first determined through chemical analysis of the pure mineral by G. S. Bohart. The ratio he determined was very close to Cu:Fe:O=1:1:2, with slightly more iron than copper. Rogers. attributed this fact to a small amount of hematite in the sample. In order to determine the composition of delafossite Rogers used the Ziervogel process. The Ziervogel process is used to test for the presence of cuprous oxides by looking for the "spangle reaction" which produces thin flakes of metallic silver when cuprous oxide is mixed with silver sulfate. When Rogers heated powdered delafossite with silver sulfate solution, the spangle reaction occurred. The only oxides possibilities to consider for delafossite are cuprous copper and ferrous iron. Rogers concluded that the iron was combining with the oxygen as a radical and that it only acted as a radical. This indicated that the copper in delafossite was in the cuprous rather than the cupric form. Hence he concluded that the composition of delafossite was probably cuprous metaferrite, CuFe3+O2. This composition was later confirmed by Pabst by the determination of interionic distances in the crystal lattice.

Structure
The atomic structure of delafossite and the delafossite group consists of a sheet of linearly coordinated A cations stacked between edge-shared octahedral layers (BO6).  In the delafossite atomic structure there are two alternating planar layers. The two layers consist of one layer triangular-patterned A cations and a layer of edge-sharing BO6 octahedra compacted with respect to the c axis. The delafossite structure can have two polytypes according to the orientation of the planar layer stacking. Hexagonal 2H types that have a space group of P63/mmc are formed when two A layers are stacked with each layer rotated 180° in relation to one another. Alternatively, when the layers are stacked each layer in the same direction in relation to one another, it makes a rhombohedral 3R type with a space group of Rm.

Physical properties
The color of delafossite is black, with a hardness of 5.5, and imperfect cleavage in the {101} direction. Pabst calculated the density of delafossite to be 5.52. Contact twinning has been observed in the {0001} direction. The unit cell parameters were calculated to be a = 3.0351 Å, c = 17.166 Å, V = 136.94 Å3. Delafossite is tabular to equidimensional in habit and has a black streak and a metallic luster. Delafossite has hexagonal symmetry that can have the space groups Rm or P63/mmc depending on the stacking of A cation layers. Delafossite compounds can have magnetic properties when magnetic ions are in the B cation position. Delafossite compounds also have properties dealing with electric conductivity such as insulation and/or metallic conduction. Delafossite compounds can exhibit p- or n-type conductivity based on their composition.

Rhombohedral (3R), CuFeO2 properties:
P-type semiconductor, bandgap 1.47 eV
High light absorption coefficient of 7.5 cm−1 near the band gap edge at 700 nm.
High hole mobility of 34 cm2 v−1 s−1 even at doping levels as high as 1.8 × 1019 cm−3.
Good stability in aqueous environments.

Hexagonal (2H), CuFeO2 properties:
unknown as pure 2H CuFeO2 is very difficult to synthesize.

Synthesis 
3R CuFeO2 is often synthesized by solid state reactions, sol gel methods, vapor deposition, and hydrothermal synthesis.

Pure 2H CuFeO2 and other 2H delafossite-type oxides are difficult to synthesize. The only pure 2H CuFeO2 crystals were pure 2H CuFeO2 nanoplates with a thickness of about 100 nm which were synthesized at temperatures as low as 100 °C from CuI and FeCl3·6H2O.

Application 
Solar cells: 2H CuFeO2 has a band gap of 1.33 eV and a high absorption coefficient of 3.8 cm−1 near the band gap edge at 700 nm. It demonstrated a photovoltaic effect when placed into thin film structures composed of ITO/ZnO/2H CuFeO2/graphite/carbon black.

Other applications: CuFeO2 is made of earth abundant elements and has good stability in aqueous environments, and as such was investigated as photocathodes for photoelectrochemical reduction of CO2, solar water reduction, and as a cathode material in lithium batteries. Whereas the 3R phase was somewhat characterized, only X-ray diffraction and theoretical calculation of eg and t2g occupancies of the Fe3+ are available for 2H CuFeO2.

Geologic occurrence
In 1873, delafossite was discovered by Charles Friedel in a region of Ekaterinbug, Siberia.  Since its discovery it has been identified as a fairly common mineral found in such places as the copper mines of Bisbee, Arizona. Delafossite is usually a secondary mineral often found in oxidized areas of copper deposits although it can be a primary mineral as well. Delafossite can be found as massive, relatively distinct crystals on hematite. Delafossite has since been found in mines around the world from Germany to Chile.

Origin of the name
Delafossite was first noted by Charles Friedel in 1873 and given the composition Cu2O·Fe2O3. The mineral was given the name delafossite in honor of the French mineralogist and crystallographer Gabriel Delafosse (1796–1878). Delafosse is known for noting the close relationship between crystal symmetry and physical properties.

See also
List of minerals
List of minerals named after people
I-III-VI semiconductors

References

Oxide minerals
Trigonal minerals
Minerals in space group 166